Gai Saber is an Italian folk group focused on the musical and dance traditions of Italian Occitania.  Gai Saber draws its name from a medieval Occitan poetic academy that traces its roots to the regions influential troubadour culture. It is also the origin of Nietzsche's book on poetry, The Gay Science.

Founded in 1992 as Kalenda Maia, the group adopted its current name in 1996.  They use a wide variety of traditional Occitanic instruments like the ghironda, lou semitoun, galoubet, lou tambourin, fifre, and piva alongside the modern guitar, keyboards, and sequencers. The song 'Quan lo rossinhols escria' is included in the '1001 Songs you must hear before you die.'

Musicians
 Maurizio Giraudo
 Mauriza Giordanengo
 Paolo Brizio
 Chiara Bosonetto
 Elena Giordanengo
 Sandro Serra
 Alessandro Rapa

Discography
 Troubard R'ÒC 
 Esprit de Frontiera 
 Danimarca Live
 Electroch'Òc 
 La Fabrica Occitana

External links
Official website

Italian musical groups
Occitan music